was a city located in Yamanashi Prefecture, Japan. The city was founded on April 5, 1954.

As of 2003, the city had an estimated population of 25,856 and the density of 139.96 persons per km². The total area was 184.74 km².

History 
On November 1, 2005, Enzan, along with the town of Katsunuma, and the village of Yamato (both from Higashiyamanashi District), was merged to create the city of Kōshū.

Education
There are 3 Junior High Schools in Enzan:
Enzan Junior High
Matsusato Junior High
Enzan Kita Junior High

Notable people
 Actor Tomokazu Miura was born in Enzan in 1952.

Dissolved municipalities of Yamanashi Prefecture